Metairie Cemetery is a cemetery in southeastern Louisiana. The name has caused some people to mistakenly presume that the cemetery is located in Metairie, Louisiana, but it is located within the New Orleans city limits, on Metairie Road (and formerly on the banks of the since filled-in Bayou Metairie).

History
This site was previously a horse racing track, Metairie Race Course, founded in 1838.

The race track was the site of the famous Lexington-Lecomte Race, April 1, 1854, billed as the "Great States” race.  Former President Millard Fillmore attended.  While racing was suspended because of the American Civil War, it was used as a Confederate Camp (Camp Moore) until David Farragut took New Orleans for the Union in April 1862. Metairie Cemetery was built upon the grounds of the old Metairie Race Course after it went bankrupt.

The race track, which was owned by the Metairie Jockey Club, refused membership to Charles T. Howard, a local resident who had gained his wealth by starting the first Louisiana State Lottery. After being refused membership, Howard vowed that the race course would become a cemetery. After the Civil War and Reconstruction, the track went bankrupt and Howard was able to see his curse come true. Today, Howard is buried in his tomb located on Central Avenue in the cemetery, which was built following the original oval layout of the track itself. Mr. Howard died in 1885 in Dobbs Ferry, New York when he fell from a newly purchased horse.

Metairie Cemetery was previously owned and operated by Stewart Enterprises, Inc., of Jefferson, Louisiana. However, in December 2013, Service Corporation International bought Metairie Cemetery and other Stewart locations.

Sights 

Metairie Cemetery has the largest collection of elaborate marble tombs and funeral statuary in the city.

One of the most famous is the Army of Tennessee, Louisiana Division monument, a monumental tomb of Confederate soldiers of the American Civil War. The monument includes two notable works by sculptor Alexander Doyle (1857–1922):
 Atop the tomb is an 1877 equestrian statue of General Albert Sidney Johnston on his horse "Fire-eater", holding binoculars in his right hand. General Johnston was for a time entombed here, but the remains were later removed to Texas.
 To the right of the entrance to the tomb is an 1885 life size statue represents a Confederate officer about to read the roll of the dead during the American Civil War. The statue is said to be modeled after Sergeant William Brunet of the Louisiana Guard Battery, but is intended to represent all Confederate soldiers.

Other notable monuments in Metairie Cemetery include:
 the pseudo-Egyptian pyramid;
 Laure Beauregard Larendon's tomb, which features Moorish details and beautiful stained glass;
 the former tomb of Storyville madam Josie Arlington;
 the memorial of 19th-century police chief David Hennessy, whose murder sparked a riot.

The initial construction of at least one of these elaborate final resting places – restaurateur Ruth Fertel's mausoleum – is estimated to have cost between $125,000 to $500,000 (in late 20th century dollars).

List of notable and celebrity burials

 Calogero Minacore, also known as “Carlos Joseph Marcello,” reputed crime boss and leader of the New Orleans crime family from the late-1940s to the early-1980s.
 Silvestro Carollo, crime boss and leader of the New Orleans crime family from the 1920s to the 1940s.
 Algernon Sidney Badger, New Orleans government official during and after Reconstruction
 T. L. Bayne, first Tulane University football coach and organizer of first football game in New Orleans
 P. G. T. Beauregard, Confederate General, former Superintendent at West Point
 Tom Benson, owner of New Orleans Saints and New Orleans Pelicans
 John Bernecker, stunt performer
 Renato Cellini, operatic conductor
 William C. C. Claiborne, first U.S. Governor of Louisiana
 Marguerite Clark, stage and film actress
 Lewis Strong Clarke, sugar planter and Republican politician
 Isaac Cline was the chief meteorologist at the Galveston, Texas office of the US Weather Bureau from 1889 to 1901. In that role, he became an integral figure in the devastating Galveston Hurricane of 1900.
 Hamilton D. Coleman was a businessman who held Louisiana's 2nd congressional district seat from 1889 to 1891. He was the last Republican member of the U.S. House from Louisiana until 1973.
 Al Copeland, founder of Popeyes Louisiana Kitchen
 Nathaniel Cortlandt Curtis Jr., architect, founder of Curtis and Davis Architects and Engineers.
 Jefferson Davis was buried at Metairie Cemetery, but his remains were later moved to Hollywood Cemetery in Richmond, Virginia.
 Dorothy Dell, film actress of the 1930s
 Dorothy Dix, advice columnist
 Charles E. Dunbar, New Orleans attorney and civil service reformer
 Charles E. Fenner, founder of brokerage house that became part of Merrill Lynch, Pearce, Fenner, & Smith
 Joachim O. Fernández, U.S. Representative from Louisiana's 1st congressional district from 1931 to 1941
 Ruth U. Fertel, founder of Ruth's Chris Steak House
 Benjamin Flanders, Reconstruction-era state governor and New Orleans mayor
 Jim Garrison, New Orleans District Attorney
 Edward James Gay III, U.S. Senator
 Michael Hahn, Speaker of the Louisiana House of Representatives and Governor of Louisiana
 William W. Heard, Governor of Louisiana from 1900 to 1904
 William G. Helis Sr., American oilman, racehorse/owner breeder
 Andrew Higgins, inventor of the "Higgins Boat"
 Al Hirt, jazz trumpeter
 Ken Hollis, state senator from Jefferson Parish
 John Bell Hood, Confederate General
 Chapman H. Hyams, stockbroker, businessman and philanthropist
 John E. Jackson Sr., New Orleans lawyer and state Republican chairman from 1929 to 1934
 Grace King, author
 Richard W. Leche, Governor of Louisiana
 Harry Lee, Sheriff of Jefferson Parish, Louisiana
 Samuel D. McEnery, Governor of Louisiana
 Louis H. Marrero, Jefferson Parish Police Juror & President, Jefferson Parish Sheriff, Senator, Lafourche Basin Levee Board
 John Albert Morris, the "Lottery King"
 deLesseps Story "Chep" Morrison Sr., Mayor of New Orleans
 deLesseps Story "Toni" Morrison Jr., state legislator from Orleans Parish
 Isidore Newman, New Orleans philanthropist and founder of the Maison Blanche department store chain and the regarded Isidore Newman School
 Elwyn Nicholson, state senator from 1972 to 1988, grocery store owner
 Margaret Norvell, lighthouse keeper and namesake of the coastguard cutter USCGC Margaret Norvell
 Alton Ochsner, surgeon, co-founder of Ochsner Clinic (now Ochsner Health System)
 Lionel Ott, member of the Louisiana State Senate from 1940 to 1945 and the last New Orleans finance commissioner from 1946 to 1954
 Mel Ott, Hall of Fame Major League Baseball Player
 Benjamin M. Palmer, pastor of First Presbyterian Church of New Orleans (1856–1902)
 John M. Parker, governor of Louisiana
 P. B. S. Pinchback, first African American Governor of Louisiana 1872–73
 Louis Prima, bandleader
 Stan Rice, poet
 Anne Rice, author
 John Leonard Riddell, melter and refiner of Mint 1839–1848, Postmaster 1859–1862, inventor of the binocular microscope
 John G. Schwegmann, supermarket pioneer and member of both houses of the Louisiana State Legislature
 James Z. Spearing, U.S. representative, 1924–1931, from Louisiana's 2nd congressional district
 Edgar B. Stern, businessman and civic leader
 Edith Rosenwald Stern, philanthropist
 Norman Treigle, opera star
 Helen Turner, painter
 Cora Witherspoon, stage and screen character actress

See also
 Historic Cemeteries of New Orleans
 List of United States cemeteries

References

External links

 Lake Lawn Funeral home, Metairie Cemetery
  
 Times-Picayune video tour

Cemeteries on the National Register of Historic Places in Louisiana
Protected areas of New Orleans
Buildings and structures in New Orleans
Defunct horse racing venues in Louisiana
1872 establishments in Louisiana
National Register of Historic Places in New Orleans
Rural cemeteries